Child's or Child & Co. is a British banking house.

See also
Child Ballads, a 19th-century collection of ballads by Francis James Child
Childs Hill, London, England
Childs Hill Park, London, England
Childs Restaurants, a dining chain
Childs (disambiguation)
Child (disambiguation)